The 1974 African Women's Handball Championship was the first edition of the African Women's Handball Championship, held in Tunisia. It acted as the African qualifying tournament for the 1975 World Women's Handball Championship.

History 
The Egyptian team was scheduled to play the final match against Tunisia, but Egypt withdrew because the Egyptian men's team was subjected to arbitrary injustice in the final match against Tunisia and the Tunisian public threatened them with death.

The Egyptian men's and women's teams withdrew and the African Union imposed a penalty on them by canceling all their results in the tournament As mentioned on the Egyptian website Tatweeg News.

Standings

Results

Roster

Egypt

Coach: Mounir Gerges

Player 

Nadia sherif       Club: Alahly Sc

Nadia Elzomr     Club: Alahly Sc

Afaf Moafy         Club: Alahly Sc

Amina Mahmoud      Club: Alahly Sc

Mona Amin         Club: Alahly Sc

Ghada Foad       Club: Alahly Sc

Nahed Ismail      Club: Alahly Sc

Nabila Gaber      Club: Alahly Sc

Zakia Mehrez     Club: Elgezira

Tahani Khorshed    Club: Elgezira

Nahed Sharf       Club: Elgezira

Nadia Karim       Club: Elgezira

Salwa Abo Elnaga    Club: Elgezira

Khairia                Club: Heliopiles

Tatania Vladimir   Club: Heliopiles

Final ranking

External links 
Results on todor66.com
Tatweeg News

1974 Women
African Women's Handball Championship
African Women's Handball Championship
1974 in African handball
Women's handball in Tunisia
1974 in women's handball
1974 in African women's sport